Richard "The Secret" Williams (born 9 May 1971) is an English professional light middle/middle/super middleweight boxer of the 1990s, 2000s and 2010s who won the International Boxing Organization (IBO) light middleweight title, and Commonwealth light middleweight title (twice), and was a challenger for the International Boxing Organization (IBO) light middleweight title against Sergio Gabriel Martinez, and British Boxing Board of Control (BBBofC) British middleweight title against Howard Eastman, his professional fighting weight varied from , i.e. light middleweight to , i.e. super middleweight. Richard Williams is trained by Brian Lawrence, and managed by Barry Hearn, and John Rooney.

References

External links

Image - Richard Williams

1971 births
English male boxers
Light-middleweight boxers
Light-welterweight boxers
Living people
Middleweight boxers
Place of birth missing (living people)
Boxers from Greater London
Super-middleweight boxers